Randolph Murdaugh III (October 25, 1939June 10, 2021) was an American attorney who served as the circuit solicitor of South Carolina's 14th judicial district from 1986 until 2006. The Murdaugh family had held the office since Randolph Murdaugh Sr.'s election in 1920; RandolphIII was the last Murdaugh to hold the office. RandolphIII was the third patriarch of the Murdaugh family from the 1980s until he died in 2021.

Early life and education 

Randolph Murdaugh III was born October 25, 1939, in Savannah, Georgia, the son of Randolph "Buster" Murdaugh Jr. and Gladys Marvin. Randolph graduated from Wade Hampton High School in 1957, the University of South Carolina with a Bachelor of Science in business administration in 1961, and the University of South Carolina School of Law in 1964.

Circuit solicitor 

Randolph Murdaugh III  succeeded his father, Randolph "Buster" Murdaugh Jr., as circuit solicitor of South Carolina's 14th judicial district in 1986. He was president of the South Carolina Solicitor's Association between 1995 and 1996 and served on the National District Attorney's Association Board of Directors between 1998 and 2005. He ran unopposed for all five of his terms and held office until retiring in 2006. He was succeeded by Duffie Stone.

Retirement and private practice 

After retiring from public office, he returned to private practice at his family's law firm. In 2019 Randolph III was awarded the Order of the Palmetto, South Carolina's highest civilian recognition, by Governor Henry McMaster.

Personal life, family, and death 

Randolph III was married to Elizabeth Alexander and had four children including three sons, RandolphIV (called Randy) and Richard Alexander (called Alex; b.May 27, 1968), both of whom entered the family firm; and John Marvin.  RandolphIII died of natural causes June 10, 2021 three days after his son Alex murdered his wife, Margaret and his son, Paul. He was buried at Hampton Cemetery.

References 

1939 births
2021 deaths
20th-century American politicians
Randolph Murdaugh III
People from Hampton County, South Carolina
People from Savannah, Georgia
South Carolina state solicitors
University of South Carolina School of Law alumni